The 1977 European Cup was the 6th edition of the European Cup of athletics.

It was the first edition to introduce "A" and "B" Finals. The "A" Finals were held in Helsinki, Finland. The first two teams in those qualified for the inaugural IAAF World Cup.

"A" Final
Held in Helsinki on 13 and 14 August for both men and women.

Team standings

Results summary

Men's events

Women's events

"B" Final
The winners qualified for the "A" final.

Men
Held on 6 and 7 August in Gothenburg, Sweden

Women
Held on 6 August in Třinec, Czechoslovakia

Semifinals

Men
All semifinals were held on 16 and 17 July. First two teams qualified for the "A" final (plus Finland as the host). Places 3–5 qualified for the "B" final.

Semifinal 1
Held in Athens, Greece

Semifinal 2
Held in Warsaw, Poland

Semifinal 3
Held in London, United Kingdom

Women
All semifinals were held on 16 July. First two teams qualified for the "A" final (plus Finland as the host). Places 3–5 qualified for the "B" final.

Semifinal 1
Held in Stuttgart, West Germany

Semifinal 2
Held in Dublin, Ireland

Semifinal 3
Held in Bucharest, Romania

Preliminaries
Preliminaries were held in Søllerød, Denmark, on 25 and 26 June for both men and women. First three teams advanced to the semifinals.

References

External links
European Cup results (Men) from GBR Athletics
European Cup results (Women) from GBR Athletics

European Cup (athletics)
European Cup
1977 in Finnish sport
International athletics competitions hosted by Finland